The Seashells Resort at Suncrest is a resort in the area of Qawra, in Saint Paul's Bay, Malta. Built in 1987 as Suncrest Hotel by Angelo Xuereb, owner of AX Holdings, which owns AX Hotels. Joseph Vella has been acting as a general manager since 2009.

Ownership and Management
The resort is owned and managed by AX Hotels, a subsidiary of AXHoldings, since 1987. For a brief period, the Suncrest Hotel, as it was originally known, was managed by Sol Melia. The hotel became known as Sol Suncrest. In 2004, the Spanish chain and the Maltese holding company mutually terminated their agreement. In 2009, the hotel changed its name once again, this time from Suncrest Hotel to Seashells Resort at Suncrest.

Renovations
Since its opening, the hotel went through various renovations.

The hotel's main restaurant, the Coral Cove, was fully remodeled 2014, at a cost of over €500,000, including a new kitchen. 

In 2015 a major renovation of all the hotel rooms was undertaken at a cost of over €7 million. At the same time the Cheeky Monkey Gastropub was open and the Luzzu complex was annexed.

Accommodation
The hotel has 452 rooms. The hotel also retains a few timeshare units.

Dining
There are three restaurants:
 The main restaurant, the Coral Cove, serves breakfast, lunch and dinner in buffet style.
 It-Tokk serves Maltese cuisine one in buffet style.
 The Cheeky Monkey Gastropub serves as a happy hour bar complemented with a pub grub menu.

Leisure
The resort has two pool areas, one for families, and one for adults only, and a wellness spa.

Conference
The hotel also houses a small conference centre.

References

Hotels in Malta
St. Paul's Bay